Sablon, a French name, may refer to:
 Sablon (in French) or Zavel (in Dutch), a square on a hill by the same name, in the old area of Brussels
 Sablons (disambiguation), the name of several communes in France
 Sablon diecast, a miniature toy car maker from Belgium
 Northprintex, Industri sablon indonesia

People with the surname Sablon:
 Germaine Sablon, French singer and actress
 Jean Sablon, French singer and actor
 Paul Sablon (1888–1940), Belgian film director and animal trainer